Shagan may refer to:

Shagan (Irtysh), a river in Kazakhstan
Shagan (Ural), a river in Kazakhstan and Russia
Shagan Lake, an artificial lake in Kazakhstan 
Shagan Olympic Sport Complex Stadium, a stadium in Baku, Azerbaijan
Şağan (or Shagan), a settlement and municipality in Baku, Azerbaijan
Sary Shagan, an anti-ballistic missile testing range in Kazakhstan

People with the surname
Ethan H. Shagan (born 1971), American historian of early modern Britain
Steve Shagan (1927–2015), American novelist, screenwriter, and television and film producer

See also
Chagan (disambiguation)